Somerset Collection is a superregional, luxury shopping mall, located in Metro Detroit, in Troy, Michigan with more than 180 specialty stores. Somerset Collection, developed, managed, and co-owned by The Forbes Company, is among the most profitable malls in the United States not owned by a real estate investment trust. Out of the 100 most profitable malls, 76 are owned by real estate investment trusts.

History 

In 1969, Saks Fifth Avenue opened a stand-alone store on Big Beaver Road in Troy, an affluent suburb 20 miles northwest of downtown Detroit. A one-floor upscale "Somerset Mall" designed by Louis G. Redstone Associates, was built onto the existing Saks, anchored by it and a new Bonwit Teller. Thirty five additional stores opened, including I. Miller, Abercrombie & Fitch, Mark Cross, and FAO Schwarz.

Bonwit Teller significantly renovated its store in 1988, only to close in 1990 after the chain went bankrupt. In 1991-1992 the center was renamed Somerset Collection, a second level was added, and Neiman Marcus opened a store on the site of the razed Bonwit Teller. Completed in August 1992, Saks was renovated and expanded with more luxury stores, like Tiffany's, opening their doors.

Following the success of the revamped mall, co-owners Forbes/Cohen Properties and Frankel Associates opened a new three-story $30,000,000, 940,000 sq ft expansion across from Somerset Mall on August 11, 1996, designed by JPRA Architects.

Michigan's first Nordstrom and a Hudson's (converted to Marshall Field's and then Macy's) anchored the three-story expansion, named Somerset North. When Marshall Fields was converted to Macy's in 2006, Somerset became one of only three malls in the country to host all four department stores.

Connecting the two malls is a 700 ft (0.21 km) enclosed bridge known as the "Skywalk" over Big Beaver Road. The enclosed, climate-controlled skybridge was one of the first of its kind in the country, featuring moving walks to move shoppers between Somerset Collection South and Somerset Collection North.

In 2004, Somerset South, the original part of the Collection, was renovated. The mall features lighting by Paul Gregory (Focus Lighting), a continuous skylight, glass elevators, and fountains designed by WET. The Somerset Collection includes several notable sculptures, including a Finnish Sorvikivi Floating Stone fountain. Mall at Millenia, in Orlando, Florida, also designed by JPRA Architects, was based on Somerset Collection and is similar in design. Neither mall has kiosks.

In December 2009, the Forbes Company acquired an adjacent site on which an open-air mixed-use development known as the Pavilions of Troy was proposed. Although plans were approved, the project did not move forward, and no further plans were announced.

In 2012, calling it “strategic capital investments”, Saks renovated its store after it identified the Somerset location as having “high growth potential”.

In 2016, Chick-fil-A opened a location in the Peacock Cafe food court, the first location in Metro Detroit that was not at the food court of a college campus or airport.

In 2017, Zara opened its first store in Michigan on the first and second floors of the Macy's wing.

While the Collection was temporarily shuttered due to the 2020 COVID-19 pandemic, Chick-fil-A operated a massive 18-wheeler mobile drive-thru truck in the otherwise empty Collection parking lot near Macy's.

Shops and restaurants
The Somerset Collection contains  of gross leasable area with over 180 stores. The four department store anchors are: Nordstrom (240,000 sq ft (0.02 km²)) and Macy's (300,000 sq ft (0.03 km²)) in Somerset North, and Neiman Marcus (141,000 sq ft (0.01 km²)) and Saks Fifth Avenue (160,000 sq ft (0.01 km²)) in Somerset South.

The third level of the Somerset Collection North features a food court called The Peacock Cafes, featuring 10 restaurants and seating for 650 customers.

Services
Somerset provides valet parking and a full-service concierge staff. The concierge service includes a variety of services such as gift wrapping, stroller and wheelchair rental. Wi-Fi access is available in the Peacock Cafe, in addition to Wi-Fi access inside the Macy's and other stores.

Special events 
Special events are hosted at Somerset Collection year-round. The layout includes stages for the performing arts. The special events include yoga classes, special savings, Santa visits during the Christmas season, fashion shows, and other events sponsored by the Collection and individual stores.

In 2011, the Forbes Company debuted a group of pop-up mini-shops called Somerset Collection CityLoft in Downtown Detroit, specifically at the Lower Woodward Avenue Historic District, which had been a major Detroit shopping district. Various stores from Somerset have opened pop up shops on Merchant's Row in the 1200 to 1400 block of Woodward Avenue, generally open the last Thursday to Saturday of the month from June through August, and occasionally September. In 2012 this concept was extended to the Christmas season, with CityLoft Holiday "Yappy" Hour.

Gallery

See also

Architecture of metropolitan Detroit
Economy of metropolitan Detroit
Metro Detroit
Tourism in metropolitan Detroit

Notes

References and further reading

Shopping malls in Oakland County, Michigan
Shopping malls established in 1969
Buildings and structures in Troy, Michigan
1969 establishments in Michigan